{{DISPLAYTITLE:C7H14NO5P}}
The molecular formula C7H14NO5P (molar mass: 223.16 g/mol) may refer to:

 Monocrotophos, an organophosphate insecticide
 Selfotel, a competitive NMDA antagonist

Molecular formulas